A sheep dog or sheepdog is generally a dog or breed of dogs historically used in connection with the raising of sheep. These  include livestock guardian dogs used to guard sheep and other livestock and herding dogs used to move, manage and control sheep and other livestock.

Herding breeds 

 Australian Cattle Dog
 Australian Kelpie
 Australian Shepherd
 Basque Shepherd Dog
 Beauceron
 Belgian Shepherds
 Groenendael
 Laekenois
 Malinois
 Tervuren
 Bergamasco Shepherd
 Berger Blanc Suisse
 Bouvier des Flandres
 Bohemian shepherd
 Briard
 Can de Chira
 Caucasian Shepherd
 Can de Palleiro
 Cão da Serra de Aires
 Carea Castellano Manchego
 Carea Leonés
 Canaan Dog
 Catahoula Leopard Dog
 Catalan Sheepdog
 Chiribaya Dog
 Collies
 Bearded Collie
 Border Collie
 Rough Collie
 Scotch Collie
 Smooth Collie
 Welsh Sheepdog
 Croatian Sheepdog
 Cumberland Sheepdog
 Dutch Shepherd
 English Shepherd
 Finnish Lapphund
 Garafian Shepherd
 German Shepherd
 Gaucho sheepdog
 Huntaway
 Icelandic Sheepdog
 Koolie
 Komondor
 Lancashire Heeler
 Lapponian Herder
 Magellan sheep dog
 McNab
 Miniature American Shepherd
 Mudi
 New Zealand Heading Dog
 Norwegian Buhund
 Old English Sheepdog
 Pastore della Lessinia e del Lagorai
 Picardy Shepherd
 Polish Lowland Sheepdog
 Polish Tatra Sheepdog
 Portuguese Sheepdog
 Puli dog
 Pumi
 Pyrenean Shepherd
 Rottweiler
 Slovak Cuvac
 Tornjak
 Schapendoes
 Schipperke
 Shetland Sheepdog
 Smithfield
 Swedish Lapphund
 Swedish Vallhund
 Welsh Corgis:
 Cardigan Welsh Corgi
 Pembroke Welsh Corgi

Livestock guardian dog breeds 

 Aidi
 Akbash dog
 Aksaray Malaklisi
Armenian Gampr 
Ashayeri Dog
Azerbaijani Shepherd Dog
Bakharwal dog
Bucovina Shepherd 
Buryat-Mongolian Wolfhound
Cane di Mannara
Cão de Castro Laboreiro
Cão de Gado Transmontano
Carpathian Shepherd Dog
Caucasian Shepherd Dog
Central Asian Shepherd Dog
Estrela Mountain Dog
Georgian Shepherd
Ghadrejani dog
Great Pyrenees
Greek Shepherd
Himalayan Sheepdog
Kangal Shepherd 
Karakachan
Kars
Karst Shepherd
Komondor
Koyun dog
Kuchi
Kuvasz
Maremmano-Abruzzese Sheepdog
Mazandrani dog
Mioritic Shepherd
Mongolian banhar
Mucuchies
Persian Mastiff
 Polish Tatra Sheepdog
 Pshdar dog
 Pyrenean Mastiff
 Rafeiro do Alentejo
 Romanian Raven Shepherd Dog
 Sardinian Shepherd Dog
 Šarplaninac
 Shirak Sheepdog
 Slovak Cuvac
 Spanish Mastiff
 Tibetan kyi apso
 Tibetan Mastiff
 Tobet
 Torkuz
 Tornjak
 Vikhan Sheepdog

See also 
Droving
Guard llama
Livestock guardian dog
Sheepdog trial
Dogs portal

References 

Dog roles
Human–animal communication
Working dogs
Sheep farming